The Lappohja railway station (formerly) is located in the town of Hanko (formerly the municipality of Tenala), Finland, in the village of Lappohja. It is located along the Karis–Hanko railway, and its neighboring stations are Skogby in the east and Santala in the west.

History 

Lappohja is one of the original stations of the private Hyvinkää–Hanko railway; it was placed close to the location where the line meets the natural harbour of the Tvärminne Storfjärden bay of the Gulf of Finland. The majority of cargo transport on the line consisted of timber.

Lappohja was included in the area leased by Finland to the Soviet Union in the aftermath of the Winter War. On the onset of the Continuation War and the escape of Soviet troops from Hanko, it was discovered that the original station building and the harbour siding had been destroyed. The former was replaced by a new building of a simple design in 1942. As the importance of the station grew during the time of war, it was upgraded from a pysäkki to a class V station in 1944 and further to class IV in 1945.

In 1962, a siding from the west side of the station to the  steelworks was constructed. Another siding followed in 1986, this time from the east side to the Rautaruukki factory. Ticket sale services at Lappohja were ceased in 2000, and it became an unmanned station later in the same year due to the Karis–Hanko section becoming remote controlled. The station building was transferred to the ownership of Senate Properties in 2007.

Services 
Lappohja is served by all regional trains on the Karis–Hanko line; the default type of rolling stock for this line is the Dm12 railbus.

External links 
 Train departures and arrivals at Lappohja on Finrail

References 

Hanko
Railway stations opened in 1873
Railway stations in Uusimaa